Matthew James Ulrich (born December 30, 1981) is a former American football offensive guard for the Indianapolis Colts of the National Football League. He won Super Bowl XLI with the Colts during the 2006 season over the Chicago Bears.

Ulrich was named Northwestern University team captain in 2004 and earned All-Big Ten Honorable Mention. He was named National Strength and Conditioning All-American in 2004 and still holds many Northwestern weight room records including squat (715), bench press (475), and incline press (425). Ulrich graduated in 2000 from Streamwood High School, where he won All-State and All-Midwest honors in football and also competed in the shot put. He was a three time Academic All-State in Illinois.

He is retired from the NFL, and is the Co-Founder of Dexa Fit (Body Fat Testing and Metabolic Analysisà and was Director of Operations/Sports Performance at Winning Edge Athletics in Chicago. Currently, Matt Ulrich is a Director with Profitable Ideas Exchange where he leads a team that convenes and facilitates peer-to-peer interactions of Chief Procurement Officers, Supply Chain Executives, Chief Marketing Officers, Chief Tax Officers and Managing Partners on behalf of a variety of clients including Accenture, KPMG, and Slalom Consulting.

References

1981 births
Living people
Players of American football from Chicago
American football offensive guards
Northwestern Wildcats football players
Indianapolis Colts players
Berlin Thunder players
People from Streamwood, Illinois